Charles Buchanan Markham was born on September 15, 1926 in Durham, North Carolina. He served as the mayor of Durham from 1981 until 1985.

See also
1981 Durham mayoral election
1983 Durham mayoral election

References

1926 births
2010 deaths
Mayors of Durham, North Carolina